Avast SecureLine VPN is a VPN service developed by Czech cybersecurity software company Avast. It is available for Android, Microsoft Windows, macOS and iOS operating systems.

The VPN can be set to automatically turn on when the user connects to a public Wi-Fi.

Functionality
Similar to other VPNs, SecureLine works by making the user appear in a different place via changing the users IP address, bypassing internet censorship for the country the user is in or Wi-Fi the user is using. The VPN can be set to automatically turn on when the user connects to a public Wi-Fi.

Security features of Avast SecureLine VPN include: 256-bit Advanced Encryption Standard, single shared IP, DNS leak protection, kill switch, and Smart Connection Rules.

Server locations
Avast has egress servers in more than 60 cities world-wide. Servers in eight cities support P2P connections for protocols like BitTorrent and further servers are dedicated to users of streaming services.

See also
 Comparison of virtual private network services
 Information privacy
 Internet privacy

References

External links
 

SecureLine VPN
Android (operating system) software
iOS software
MacOS software
Proprietary software
Virtual private network services
Windows software
Gen Digital software